"Suicide Note" is a two-part song by American heavy metal band Pantera from their eighth studio album, The Great Southern Trendkill. The first half of the song was released as the album's second single in 1996. The combination total time is 9 minutes and 3 seconds.

The first part of the song was nominated for a Grammy Award in 1997.

Background 
"Suicide Note Pt. I" features 12-string acoustic guitars, keyboards, and bass drum beats in the style of a heartbeat. Guitarist Dimebag Darrell told Guitar World magazine in 1996 that he wrote all the guitar parts of the song the first time he picked up a 12-string guitar that Washburn Guitars had sent him in recognition of his new endorsement of the company.

The song breaks into "Suicide Note Pt. II", which in stark contrast to Pt. I, is a fast-tempo song featuring low tunings, screamed vocals throughout, and a breakdown at its climax. The main riff in Pt. II features extensive use of the DigiTech Whammy effects pedal which is used throughout most of the song including the chaotic solo.

Pt. I was omitted from the original vinyl pressing of The Great Southern Trendkill in 1996. It was however included on a limited edition 24 bit audiophile pressing in 2012.

The lyrics describe suicide attempts such as slitting of the wrist. Pt. I talks in particular about drug use whereas Pt. II describes the determination of suicide by gunshot.

Reception 
Metal Hammer ranked the first part of the song number 24 on their list of the 50 best Pantera songs, while the second part of the song ranked at number 20.

Loudwire ranked both parts number eight on their list of the top 10 Pantera songs.

Track listing (single)

Personnel

Part I
 Philip Anselmo – lead vocals 
 Dimebag Darrell – 12-string acoustic guitar

Additional personnel
 Big Ross – keyboards

Part II
 Philip Anselmo – lead vocals 
 Dimebag Darrell – guitars
 Rex Brown – bass
 Vinnie Paul – drums

Additional personnel
 Seth Putnam (of Anal Cunt) – additional vocals

References 

1996 singles
Pantera songs
1996 songs
Songs about drugs
Songs about suicide
Song recordings produced by Terry Date
Songs written by Dimebag Darrell
Songs written by Vinnie Paul
Songs written by Phil Anselmo
Songs written by Rex Brown
East West Records singles